Sherman Chung Shu-man, (born 20 June 1984) is a Hong Kong cantopop singer. She started her career after winning the 2005 EEG Singing Contest (aka 24th annual New Talent Singing Awards Hong Kong Regional Finals). During 2006, she underwent a series of intensive training and released her first single "The Throes of Master" (高手過招) in 2007.

Summary
Sherman Chung's childhood dream was to be painter and pianist.

When Chung was 21 years old in 2005, she participated in TVB International Chinese New Talent Singing Championship of Emperor Entertainment Group Co., Ltd. (EEG), and won the championship by singing Faye Wong's original song "Wonderful for Him" (Golden Mi Award), and join Emperor Entertainment Group to practice for a year.

In 2007, Chung officially debuted with "The Throes of Master".

On October 2, 2009, the hit work "A Letter to Myself" was released, and with this song, it won 11 consecutive awards at the 2009 four major award ceremonies.

In mid-March 2015, as the singer Deep Ng who was the same company was repeatedly exposed by the media for stealing food while the woman was working in other places, she unilaterally announced his breakup.

On July 11, 2020, Sherman Chung officially announced that she would leave from Emperor Entertainment Group and return to freelance in September of the same year. Her sister Sukie Chung supported her decision.

Discography
 Good Girl? (乖女仔) (2007)
 Castle (2008)
 Thunder Party (2008)
 A Letter to Myself (給自己的信) (2009)
 One Mission (2010)
 It's A Beautiful Day (2011)
 I Can (2012)
 SC (2012)
 Everlasting (2013)
 What If... (EP) (2014)
 True Instinct (EP) (2015)
 Sherman, I, Me and Myself (EP) (2016)

Movies
2008 - Love Is Elsewhere (愛情萬歲)
2008 - Beast Stalker (証人)
2010 - 72 Tenants of Prosperity
2010 - The Stool Pigeon
2011 - Summer Love Love
2011 - Lan Kwai Fong
2011 - Life without Principle
2012 - Hold My Love
2018 - A Beautiful Moment
2018 - Adieu

Awards
2005 - EEG Singing Contest (Winner) - Golden Mic Award

References

External links
Sherman english interview
Sherman Weibo
EEG Official Website- Sherman Chung

1984 births
Living people
New Talent Singing Awards contestants
21st-century Hong Kong women singers